Henri Alfred Marie Jacquemart (24 February 1824, in Paris – 4 January 1896, in Paris), often known as Alfred Jacquemart, was a noted French sculptor and animalier. He usually signed his works: A. Jacquemart.

Jacquemart studied under painter Paul Delaroche and sculptor Jean Baptiste Jules Klagmann. He entered the École des Beaux-Arts in 1845.

Jacquemart exhibited at the Paris Salon from 1847–1879, receiving medals in 1857, 1863 and 1865. He traveled in Egypt and Turkey, and was commissioned by the city of Alexandria, Egypt, to create a colossal statue of Muhammad Ali of Egypt.

He sculpted in large, medium and small scale. Many of his works were cast in bronze by the Val d' Osne foundry and some by the silversmith Christofle. Ultimately, however, he earned his reputation for his many larger animal works. In 1870 Jacquemart became a Chevalier of the Légion d'honneur.

Jacquemart died suddenly at his apartment in the Rue de Babylone, Paris on the night of 4 January 1896. His funeral was delayed until 13 January for the arrival of his son, Maurice, who lived in Tunis and was held at the Eglise Saint Thomas d'Aquin, Paris.

Selected works 
 Sphinxes (four), La Fontaine du Palmier, Paris, 1858
 Chimera (two), La Fontaine Saint-Michel, Paris, c.1860
 Evangelists (four), Église Saint-Augustin de Paris, 1862
 Valet au chiens (Huntsman and dogs), many castings (see examples below), 1866
 Louis XII on horseback, bas relief Hotel de Ville de Compiegne, 1869
 Viceroy Mohammed Ali, Alexandria, 1872
 Statue of Sakka, Cairo, 1872
 Lions (four), originally meant to stand guard by the statue of Mohammed Ali, but fattened and lengthened by two metres and placed at the opposite entrances of Qasr al-Nil Bridge, Cairo, 1873
 Lions (eight), La Fontaine Place Félix Eboué, Paris, 1874
 Soliman Pasha, Cairo, 1874
 Mohammed Laz-oglou Bey, Cairo, 1874-5
 Rhinocéros, Paris, 1878

Notes

References 
 Benezit, Emmanuel (c.1976). Dictionnnaire de peintres, sculpteurs, dessinateurs et graveurs, 6 JAC-LOY, Paris: Gründ
 Cairo Statues
 Horswell, Jane (1971). Bronze sculpture of Les Animaliers, references and price guide, Clopton, England: Antique Collectors' Club
 Insecula entry
 Kjellberg, Pierre (1994). Bronzes of the 19th Century: dictionary of sculptors, Atglen, USA: Schiffer
 Lami, Stanaslas (1914). Dictionnaire de Sculpteurs de l'ecole Francaise, Paris: E. Champion
 Mackay, James (1973). The animaliers; the animal sculptors of the 19th and 20th centuries, London: Ward Lock
 Payne, Christopher (1986). Animals in Bronze: reference and price guide, Clopton, England: Antique Collectors' Club
 Savage, George (1968). A Concise History of Bronzes, New York: Praeger

External links
 

Animal artists
1824 births
1896 deaths
Chevaliers of the Légion d'honneur
19th-century French sculptors
French male sculptors
19th-century French painters
19th-century French male artists